City of Doncaster Council is the local authority of the City of Doncaster in South Yorkshire, England, based at the Doncaster Civic Office in Waterdale, central Doncaster. It is one of four local authories in South Yorkshire and provides the majority of local government services in Doncaster. The previous borough council became a city council when Doncaster was awarded city status, which was announced in May 2022.    

The directly elected mayor is Ros Jones.

Doncaster is divided into 21 wards for electoral purposes, electing a total of 55 councillors.

From 1973 to 2014, the council was elected by thirds every year except the year in which county council elections took place in other parts of England. In 2015, the whole council was elected due to boundary changes to the wards and it was decided that the whole council would be elected every four years from 2017, so that the council elections would coincide with the election of the Mayor of Doncaster.

Political control

Since the first election to the council in 1973 political control of the council has been held by the following parties:

Wards
Doncaster is divided into 21 wards for electoral purposes with each ward electing either two or three councillors.

References

Local authorities in South Yorkshire
Mayor and cabinet executives
Local education authorities in England
Billing authorities in England
Metropolitan district councils of England
Metropolitan Borough of Doncaster